Xu Liang (1893 – 1951) was a diplomat and politician in the Republic of China. He was an important politician during the pro-Japanese collaborationist Nanjing Nationalist Government, serving as the Minister of Foreign Affairs and the ambassador to Japan. His courtesy name was Shanbo. He was born in Sanshui, Guangdong.

Biography 
Xu Liang went to Japan, and entered to Yokohama Daidou School. He then went to the United States, where he graduated from Columbia University and Washington University (from which "Washington University" he graduated is uncertain). Later, Xu Liang returned to China and was appointed a secretary to the Ministry for Justice, Ministry for Foreign Affairs, and the Interior Ministry. Afterwards he successively held the positions of secretary or advisor to many Local Governments or Legations. In the Nationalist Government era, he became a member of the Legation staff to the United States and an officer in the Ministry for Foreign Affairs.

When the Wang Jingwei regime was established in March 1940, Xu Liang also participated in it. He was appointed Vice-Minister for Foreign Affairs and Chief of the Central Political Committee's Commission for Foreign Affairs, etc. In October 1940 he was appointed Ambassador to Japan, and  sent to Manchukuo as a special envoy. That December he returned to Nanjing and was promoted to Minister of Foreign Affairs, a post which he held until October 1941. Later he was appointed member of the North China Political Council and member of the National Government.

After the Wang Jingwei regime had collapsed, Xu Liang was arrested by Chiang Kai-shek's government. He was convicted of treason and surrender to the enemy (namely Hanjian) and sentenced to death. But Xu wasn't executed, while being imprisoned in Tianjin. In the end of 1948, as the Communist army approached Tianjin, he was released by the Nationalist authorities. The following January he was once again arrested by the Communist authorities in Tianjin.

In July 1951 Xu Liang was sentenced to death by the Tianjin authorities and executed at Ningjin County, Hebei in the same year.

Alma mater 

Columbia University

References

Citations

Sources 
 
 "Xiaowangzhuang, Hebei in old days" ifeng.com (Phoenix TV) referred to Zhonglao Nianshibao, February 21, 2011.
 
 

People from Sanshui District
Ambassadors of China to Japan
Republic of China politicians from Guangdong
Chinese collaborators with Imperial Japan
Columbia University alumni
1893 births
1951 deaths
Politicians from Foshan